Cypripedium kentuckiense, the Kentucky lady's slipper or southern lady's slipper, is a member of the orchid genus Cypripedium. Members of this genus are commonly referred to as lady's slipper orchids.

Originally thought to be an aberrant form of Cypripedium parviflorum var. pubescens, the morphology of C. kentuckiense suggests it is a species of its own. However, molecular evidence suggests that C. kentuckiense is more closely related to Cypripedium parviflorum var. parviflorum than it is to Cypripedium parviflorum var. pubescens.

Description
C. kentuckiense has the largest flower of in the genus Cypripedium. The petals and sepals are greenish striped and mottled with purple while the very large lip, or pouch, is a creamy ivory or pale yellow. The plant can be up to 70 cm tall and has bract leaf-like leaves that are up to 12 cm long. Each plant is usually single-flowered.

Distribution and habitat
Cypripedium kentuckiense is found in a large swathe through the central portion of the United States including Texas, Mississippi, Kentucky, Ohio, Missouri, Arkansas, Oklahoma, Louisiana, and Tennessee. Additionally, there is a small patch in Lancaster County, Virginia. However, the range of this species is not continuous; it mostly consists of relatively isolated patches. It is most often found in deep ravines on acidic and sandstone soils.

References 

Phillip Cribb & Peter Green (1997). The Genus Cypripedium (a botanical monograph). Kew Royal Botanic Gardens, Timber Press 
Case, M.A, H.T. Mlodozeniec, L.E. Wallace, and T.W. Weldy. 1998. Conservation genetics and taxonomic status of the rare Kentucky Lady's Slipper: Cypripedium kentuckiense (Orchidaceae). American Journal of Botany, vol. 85, num. 12: 1779-1786

kentuckiense
Orchids of Kentucky
Orchids of the United States
Flora of the Eastern United States
Flora of the North-Central United States
Flora of the Southeastern United States
Flora of the Appalachian Mountains
Plants described in 1981